Confrontation is the thirteenth and final studio album by Bob Marley & the Wailers and the only to be released posthumously in May 1983, two years after Marley's death. The songs were compiled from unreleased material and singles recorded during Marley's lifetime. Many of the tracks were built up from demos, most notably "Jump Nyabinghi" where vocals from the I-Threes were added, which were not there when Marley released the song as a dubplate in 1979. In addition the harmony vocals on "Blackman Redemption" and "Rastaman Live Up" are performed by the I-Threes in order to give the album a consistent sound – on the original single versions they are performed by the Meditations. The most famous track on the album is "Buffalo Soldier".

The album cover depicts Bob Marley taking the role as the military saint Saint George slaying the dragon which symbolizes Babylon. Perhaps not coincidentally, this motif was also displayed on the reverse of the imperial standard of Rastafari icon Haile Selassie of Ethiopia, though the direct model for the album art is a British recruitment poster from World War I. Inside the album sleeve is an artist's depiction of the Battle of Adowa where Ethiopian forces defeated Italy in 1896.

Track listing

Original album (1983)

The Definitive Remastered edition (2001)

Personnel

Bob Marley – lead vocals, rhythm guitar
Aston Barrett – bass, guitar, percussion
Carlton Barrett – drums, akete
Tyrone Downie – keyboards, background vocal
Junior Marvin – guitar, backing vocals
Earl Lindo – keyboards
Alvin Patterson – percussion
I Threes (Rita Marley, Marcia Griffiths and Judy Mowatt) – backing vocals
Glen DaCosta – tenor saxophone
David Madden – trumpet
Ronald "Nambo" Robinson – trombone
Devon Evans – percussion
Carlton "Santa" Davis– drums (on "Chant Down Babylon")

Technical
Neville Garrick – art direction and graphics
Errol Brown – recording and mixing engineer
Michaell Reid – assistant engineer
Errol Brown, Chris Blackwell and Aston Barrett – mixers
Bob Marley & The Wailers and Errol Brown – producers
Azdean Marley – executive producer
Ted Jensen at Sterling Sound, NYC - mastering

Charts

Certifications

References

Albums published posthumously
Bob Marley and the Wailers compilation albums
1983 albums
Island Records compilation albums
Tuff Gong albums